Sir Donald Maclean  (9 January 1864 – 15 June 1932) was a British Liberal Party politician in the United Kingdom. He was Leader of the Opposition between 1918 and 1920 and served in the Cabinet of Ramsay MacDonald's National Government as President of the Board of Education from 1931 until his death in June the following year.

Life and career
Born in Farnworth, near Bolton, Lancashire, Maclean was the eldest son of John Maclean, a cordwainer originally of Tiree in the Inner Hebrides, and his wife Agnes Macmillan. His younger brother was Sir Ewen Maclean.

Maclean practiced as a solicitor with practices in Cardiff and Lincoln's Inn Fields, London. A member of the Presbyterian Church of England, he was vice-president of the Cardiff Free Church Council in 1902–3, and also worked closely with the National Society for the Prevention of Cruelty to Children. He was a last-minute choice as one of the Liberal Party candidates in Bath at the 1900 general election, but was defeated at the polls. At the 1906 general election, he stood again and was elected as a Liberal Member of Parliament for the constituency. Whilst an MP he voted in favour of the 1908 Women's Enfranchisement Bill.

He lost his seat at the January 1910 general election, but moved constituency at the December 1910 general election and was returned for Peebles and Selkirk, a seat he held until 1918. He then represented Peebles and South Midlothian between 1918 and 1922, losing in the 1922  United Kingdom general election, and then the Northern Division of Cornwall between 1929 and 1932.

Maclean was appointed a Privy Counsellor in 1916, and was knighted in 1917. He was Leader of the Liberal Parliamentary Party from 1918 to 1920, as the leader of the Liberal Party, H. H. Asquith had lost his seat in the House of Commons. For those two years he also served as Leader of the Opposition, while Labour had no official leader and Sinn Féin refused to participate in parliamentary government.

Towards the end of his life, Maclean joined the National Government headed by Ramsay MacDonald. He served as President of the Board of Education from 1931 to 1932.

He died from cardiovascular disease on 15 June 1932 at the age of sixty-eight.

Family

Maclean married Gwendolen Margaret Devitt (26 September 1880 – 23 July 1962), daughter of Andrew Devitt (1850–1931) and Jane Dales Morrison (1856–1947), on 2 October 1907. They are buried in the churchyard of Holy Trinity Church, Penn, Buckinghamshire, together with their eldest son, Ian. The diplomat and spy, Donald Duart Maclean, was another of his sons; his ashes are also buried there. The couple also had two more sons.

References

Bibliography
 History of the Liberal Party 1895–1970, by Roy Douglas (Sidgwick & Jackson 1971)
 Who's Who of British Members of Parliament, Volume III 1919–1945, edited by M. Stenton and S. Lees (Harvester Press 1979)

External links
 
Donald MacLean & the 1919 Treaty of Peace Act - UK Parliament Living Heritage
Biography at liberalhistory.org.uk

1864 births
1932 deaths
British Secretaries of State for Education
Liberal Party (UK) MPs for English constituencies
Members of the Privy Council of the United Kingdom
Members of the Parliament of the United Kingdom for Scottish constituencies
Presidents of the Liberal Party (UK)
Scottish Liberal Party MPs
Leaders of the Liberal Party (UK)
People from Farnworth
Knights Commander of the Order of the British Empire
UK MPs 1906–1910
UK MPs 1910–1918
UK MPs 1918–1922
UK MPs 1929–1931
UK MPs 1931–1935
British Presbyterians
Members of the Parliament of the United Kingdom for North Cornwall
Politics of Bath, Somerset
National Society for the Prevention of Cruelty to Children people
Politicians awarded knighthoods